Marguerite LeWars (born 1938 in Kingston) is a Jamaican former beauty pageant titleholder who was crowned Miss Jamaica in 1961. While serving in that capacity, she played the role of Dr. No's photographer, Annabel Chung, in the first James Bond film Dr. No, in 1962.

Early life

She was born in Kingston, Jamaica, as Marguerite LeWars. She now uses the surname Gordon taken from her second husband. Her father was Russell LeWars,the Government  Town Clerk, and her mother a housewife. She is a former Miss Jamaica. She represented Jamaica in Miss Universe in Miami.

Career
Her only screen role was in Dr. No and it was a matter of chance; the production crew of Dr. No encountered her at Kingston airport as they were preparing for filming. LeWars was an employee there at the time and they decided to use her in the film. She was first offered the role of Miss Taro but she was reluctant because of the sexual theme involved. She was then offered the small role of Annabel Chung. In the commentary of the Dr. No DVD release, LeWars reveals that makeup was applied to her face to make her appear partly Asian. She also states that her voice in the film was dubbed over by the filmmakers without her prior knowledge. LeWars was invited to London to dub but declined. In July 2022 LeWars revealed during a Really 007 Podcast that the real reason for her refusal to dub was that she had propositioned by Terence Young. She is also seen in the documentary Inside Dr. No as herself. 

LeWars worked at British West Indian Airlines and Lufthansa. She helped start Air Jamaica. LeWars started her own human resource training company, MK Careers, when she was 30. She is a regular columnist on etiquette in the Trinidad Express. LeWars has written two books.

Personal life
She lives in Trinidad and Tobago. Her second husband is Kenneth Gordon who was Trinidadian government minister was chairman of Caribbean Communications Network (CCN) and president of the West Indies Cricket Board. She has a son, Gregory, and a granddaughter who live in Vancouver. Her sister Barbara was the wife of former Jamaican Prime minister Michael Manley.

Bibliography
 Dancer, the little dog from Mayaro Beach, 1991 (children's book).
 Manners and Entertaining with Marguerite Gordon: A Guide to Caribbean Life and Style (2008)

Filmography
Dr No (1962) - Annabel Chung (Photographer)

References

External links
 

Jamaican beauty pageant winners
Jamaican columnists
Jamaican women columnists
People from Kingston, Jamaica
Living people
1930s births
Miss Universe 1961 contestants